Тhe 2019 Liga 3 was the third season under its current name and 32nd third-tier season since Georgia formed independent football league system in 1990. It began on 4 March and ended with promotion play-off return legs on 10 December.

Team changes
Following the previous season, the number of teams participating in Liga 3 was halved. With no club promoted from a lower league, the five relegated teams were among first members of the newly formed Liga 4.

From Liga 3

Promoted to Liga 2

Zugdidi ● Guria Lanchkhuti

Relegated to Liga 4

Samegrelo Chkhorotsku ● Magaroeli Chiatura ● Varketili Tbilisi ● Algeti Marneuli ● Imereti Khoni

Relegated to Regionuli Liga
Mark Stars Tbilisi ● Gardabani ● Sulori Vani ● Samgurali Tskaltubo-2 ● Machakhela Khelvachauri

To Liga 3

Relegated from Liga 2

Samgurali ● Merani

Teams and stadiums

Review 
Being considered primary favourites for promotion, Merani won the league with a large margin after an impressive performance during the entire season. They achieved their promotion goal well beforehand, with five matches still remaining. Samgurali managed to thrash their play-off rivals with an aggregate score 9-0 and return to Liga 2 after one-year absence. Aragvi also prevailed over their opponents, despite a home defeat in the first leg. 

Five teams were involved in a bitter survival battle close to the end. Gori, a most expected candidate for relegation, secured two victories in the last two games to climb out of the drop zone. Three clubs reached the finish line with equal points, but head-to-head results proved unfavourable for Borjomi, who were relegated along with Betlemi.

League table

Promotion play-offs 

Aragvi Dusheti won 2–1 on aggregate.

Samgurali Tskhaltubo won 9–0 on aggregate.

References

External links
Georgian Football Federation

Liga 3 (Georgia) seasons
3
Georgia
Georgia